Leodannis Martínez Palacio (born 29 April 1995) is a Cuban badminton player. In 2014, Martínez placed third at the 2014 Central American and Caribbean Games in the men's doubles and mixed team event. In 2015, he competed at the Pan Am Games in Toronto, Canada. In 2016, he won the Giraldilla International tournament in the men's doubles event partnered with Ernesto Reyes. He claimed 4 medals at the 2018 Central American and Caribbean Games in Barranquilla, Colombia.

Achievements

Pan American Games 
Men's doubles

Pan Am Championships 
Men's singles

Men's doubles

Central American and Caribbean Games 
Men's singles

Men's doubles

Mixed doubles

BWF International Challenge/Series (11 titles, 12 runners-up) 
Men's singles

Men's doubles

Mixed doubles

  BWF International Challenge tournament
  BWF International Series tournament
  BWF Future Series tournament

References

External links 

 

1995 births
Living people
Sportspeople from Santiago de Cuba
Cuban male badminton players
Badminton players at the 2015 Pan American Games
Badminton players at the 2019 Pan American Games
Pan American Games bronze medalists for Cuba
Pan American Games medalists in badminton
Medalists at the 2019 Pan American Games
Competitors at the 2014 Central American and Caribbean Games
Competitors at the 2018 Central American and Caribbean Games
Central American and Caribbean Games silver medalists for Cuba
Central American and Caribbean Games bronze medalists for Cuba
Central American and Caribbean Games medalists in badminton
20th-century Cuban people
21st-century Cuban people